Agelena barunae is a species of spider in the family Agelenidae, which contains at least 1,350 species . It was first described by Tikader in 1970. It is native to India.

References

barunae
Spiders of the Indian subcontinent
Spiders described in 1970